Karen Diane McDonald (born July 11, 1970) is an American lawyer and politician currently serving as the prosecuting attorney of Oakland County, Michigan, and formerly as a judge on Michigan's 6th Circuit Court in Oakland County. She is a member of the Democratic Party.

Early life, education, and career 
Karen McDonald was born on July 11, 1970 in Lansing, Michigan, alongside her fraternal twin sister Kristen McDonald Rivet, to parents Bob and Kathy McDonald. Shortly after she was born, McDonald’s parents moved from the Lansing area to Portland, Michigan, where she was raised. McDonald graduated from Portland High School and earned her B.A. in English and political science from Alma College in 1992. She became a public school English teacher and was a member of her local Michigan Education Association union.

After graduating cum laude from Wayne State University Law School in 1998, McDonald joined the Oakland County Prosecutor’s Office as an assistant prosecuting attorney, where she prosecuted child sexual assault cases as well as general misdemeanors and felonies and maintained a 100 percent conviction rate. In 2004, McDonald joined the Oakland County-based firm Jaffe, Raitt, Heuer & Weiss P.C., where she specialized in civil and family law, and was named partner and shareholder in 2010.

In her career, McDonald has carved out significant legal expertise in matters relating to children. Notably, she has been a member of the Foster Care Review Board Program Advisory Committee, Department of Health & Human Services Human Trafficking Protocol Revision Committee, Child Death Review Committee, Oakland County Youth Suicide Prevention Task Force, National Counsel of Juvenile and Family Court Judges, the Michigan Judges Association, the Women’s Lawyer Association of Michigan, and the Oakland County Bar Association. In 2018, she was the recipient of the Oakland County Domestic Violence Prevention Award and the Joan E. Young Champion of Children Award.

2012 election and Circuit Court judge

In 2012, McDonald ran for an open seat on the Oakland County Circuit Court, winning the non-partisan judicial election with nearly 60% of the vote. Taking office in January 2013, McDonald presided for over six years as a family court judge, taking a docket focused on divorce and custody, child abuse and neglect, as well as juvenile delinquency cases. In 2015, McDonald presided over the first same-sex adoption in the history of the State of Michigan, stating that the case was a great honor. McDonald was unopposed in her 2018 re-election bid, and on November 6, 2018, she was elected for a second six-year term on the 6th Circuit Court, ranking as the top vote-earner of incumbent circuit court judges.

2020 election and Oakland County Prosecutor
In April 2019, McDonald took the unusual step of stepping down from her judgeship, announcing her intention to run for the Democratic nomination for Oakland County Prosecuting Attorney in the 2020 election, thus forcing the third-term incumbent prosecutor Jessica Cooper into a highly-contested primary election. McDonald campaigned on a progressive, reformist platform focused on limiting incarceration for non-violent crimes, and ensuring prosecutorial decisions are informed by racial justice considerations. McDonald’s campaign was endorsed by 87 individuals and organizations, including the Detroit Free Press, Detroit News, Governor Gretchen Whitmer, Lieutenant Governor Garlin Gilchrist, Attorney General Dana Nessel, Wayne County Prosecutor Kym Worthy, and numerous local Democratic Party elected officials, party leaders, organizations and associations. On August 4, 2020, McDonald defeated incumbent prosecutor Jessica Cooper with two-thirds of all ballots cast, claiming the Democratic nomination for Oakland County Prosecuting Attorney and advancing to the general election. On November 3, 2020, McDonald was elected Oakland County Prosecutor, defeating her Republican opponent and ranking as the top vote-getter among all county-wide candidates.

Electoral history

References

External links 

 Karen McDonald campaign website
 Oakland County Prosecutor's Office

Michigan Democrats
Women in Michigan politics
Michigan lawyers
Michigan state court judges
21st-century American politicians
Alma College alumni
Wayne State University Law School alumni
People from Lansing, Michigan
People from Portland, Michigan
People from Oakland County, Michigan
People from Birmingham, Michigan
1970 births
Living people
21st-century American women politicians
21st-century American judges
21st-century American women judges
20th-century American lawyers
20th-century American women lawyers
21st-century American lawyers
21st-century American women lawyers